Hsieh Su-wei and Oksana Kalashnikova were the defending champions, but Hsieh chose to compete in Dubai instead. Kalashnikova played alongside Natela Dzalamidze, but lost in the quarterfinals to Irina Bara and Mihaela Buzărnescu.

Georgina García Pérez and Fanny Stollár won the title, defeating Kirsten Flipkens and Johanna Larsson in the final, 4–6, 6–4, [10–3]. This was the first WTA Tour title for both García Pérez and Stollár.

Seeds

Draw

Draw

References
Main Draw

Hungarian Ladies Open - Doubles
2018 Doubles
Lad